Brittany Ann Daniel (born March 17, 1976) is an American actress. She is the twin sister of photographer and former actress Cynthia Daniel. Daniel is best known for her roles as Jessica Wakefield in the teen drama series Sweet Valley High (1994–1997) and as Kelly Pitts in the CW/BET comedy-drama series The Game (2006–2011; 2014–2015). Her film credits include Brandy in Joe Dirt (2001) and its 2015 sequel, White Chicks (2004), and Skyline (2010).

Early life 
On March 17, 1976, Brittany and her twin sister, Cynthia, were born in Gainesville, Florida, to Carolyn and Charlton Bradford ('C.B.') Daniel Jr. They have an older brother, Brad. By age 11, both girls were signed to the Ford Agency and began modeling. They appeared in Seventeen and YM. They also appeared in ads for Doublemint gum as the Doublemint Twins.

Career 
Both girls began acting in the 1989 with an appearance in the sitcom The New Leave It to Beaver. In 1992, when she was sixteen, Brittany won the role of Mila Rosnovsky on the short-lived syndicated teen drama Swan's Crossing. She then moved to New York to film the series.

After high school, she landed the role of Jessica Wakefield in the television series Sweet Valley High (twin sister Cynthia portrayed Jessica's twin, Elizabeth). During the run of Sweet Valley High, the girls made their film debut in the drama The Basketball Diaries (1995) alongside Leonardo DiCaprio.

After Sweet Valley High was canceled in 1997, Daniel continued acting in films and television series including a stint on Dawson's Creek in 1999 and a role in the TBS television movie On Hostile Ground the following year. In 2001, she appeared as David Spade's love interest, Brandy, in Joe Dirt. In 2002, Daniel played one of the lead characters in the short-lived Fox series That '80s Show.

In 2002, she played Eric Forman's cousin Penny on That '70s Show. Daniel also appeared on the show It's Always Sunny in Philadelphia as a transgender woman named Carmen. She teamed with the Wayans Brothers for their films White Chicks (2004) and Little Man (2006). That same year, she appeared in the VH1 television movie Totally Awesome before landing a lead role in The CW Television Network's half-hour comedy The Game, which she starred in until 2011. However, she would return to the show in 2014. In February 2010, she was cast in the Brothers Strause thriller Skyline; the film was released on November 12, 2010.

Personal life
In March 2014, Daniel revealed that in 2011, she was diagnosed with stage IV non-Hodgkin's lymphoma, for which she underwent chemotherapy. As of 2014, she was cancer-free.

She dated actor Keenen Ivory Wayans from 2007 to 2014. In 2017, she married Adam Touni. On 24 October 2021 Brittany welcomed a daughter, Hope Rose Touni after her sister, Cynthia, donated her egg.

Filmography

Film

Television

Awards and nominations

References

External links 

 

1976 births
Actresses from Florida
American child actresses
American film actresses
American television actresses
Gainesville High School (Florida) alumni
Identical twin actresses
Living people
Actresses from Gainesville, Florida
American twins
20th-century American actresses
21st-century American actresses
Female models from Florida